Věžovatá Pláně is a municipality and village in Český Krumlov District in the South Bohemian Region of the Czech Republic. It has about 200 inhabitants.

Administrative parts
The village of Dolní Pláně is an administrative part of Věžovatá Pláně.

References

Villages in Český Krumlov District